Alice Hewson (born 19 August 1997) is an English professional golfer. She won the 2019 European Ladies Amateur and joined the Ladies European Tour in 2020 to win in her first event, the Investec South African Women's Open.

Amateur career
Hewson hails from Berkhamsted, Hertfordshire. She started golf at the age of six with her Dad and played in her first tournament on her seventh birthday. She won the England U13 championships and was in the National U18 team at age 15. Her first GB&I cap came at age 15 in the Junior Vagliano Trophy and she played in three Vagliano Trophies. She also represented Great Britain & Ireland in the Curtis Cup in 2016 and 2018 and the Astor Trophy.

Hewson represented England twice at the European Girls' Team Championship and five times at the European Ladies' Team Championship. She was the only player to be part of both England teams to win the European Ladies' Team Championships consecutively in 2016 and 2017.

Hewson attended Clemson University 2015–2019 and majored in accounting. She won her first two tournaments as a freshman, and by the time she graduated she held 49 records at Clemson.

Individually, she played in the inaugural Augusta National Women's Amateur in 2019 and finished T10 with at even-par. Also in 2019, she captured the European Ladies Amateur Championship. She scored two eagles coming from seven shots behind in the final round to win in a five-hole playoff. The win qualified her for her first major, the 2019 Women's British Open, played at Woburn Golf and Country Club, less than 30 minutes from her home.

Professional career
In 2020, Hewson finished 5th at LET Q-School at La Manga Club and started her LET career with a win in her first event, the Investec South African Women's Open. Held at Westlake Golf Club in Cape Town in mid-March, it was the last tournament played before the COVID-19 pandemic caused a global halt of competitive play.

To keep sharp during lockdown she played in the Rose Ladies Series where she won the Grand Final with scores of 67 and 70 (−5), ahead of seasoned campaigners and Solheim Cup stars such as Charley Hull and Georgia Hall.

Amateur wins
2010 England U13 Championship
2013 Scottish U16 Championship, Daily Telegraph Championship
2015 Cougar Classic, Lady Paladin
2018 Clemson Invitational
2019 European Ladies Amateur Championship

Sources:

Professional wins (2)

Ladies European Tour wins (1)

Other wins (1)
2020 Rose Ladies Series Grand Final

Results in LPGA majors

CUT = missed the half-way cut
NT = no tournament
T = tied

Team appearances
Amateur
Junior Vagliano Trophy: (representing Great Britain & Ireland): 2013
Vagliano Trophy (representing Great Britain & Ireland): 2015, 2017, 2019
Curtis Cup (representing Great Britain & Ireland): 2016 (winners), 2018
Astor Trophy (representing Great Britain & Ireland): 2019
European Girls' Team Championship (representing England): 2013, 2014
European Ladies' Team Championship (representing England): 2015, 2016 (winners), 2017 (winners), 2018, 2019
Espirito Santo Trophy (representing England): 2016

References

External links

English female golfers
Clemson Tigers women's golfers
Ladies European Tour golfers
Sportspeople from Hemel Hempstead
1997 births
Living people